Elven Star is a fantasy novel by American writers Margaret Weis and Tracy Hickman, the second book in The Death Gate Cycle series. It was released in 1990.  

The book covers the reconnaissance of Pryan, by Haplo at the behest of the Lord of the Nexus.  Pryan is one of the four elemental worlds in the universe of the series, created by the sundering of the Earth.

Plot

On steamy Pryan, Realm of Fire, never-ending sunlight and plentiful rain have created a jungle so vast that humans and elves dwell high in the trees and only dwarves live anywhere near the ground. From the treetops the aristocratic elves sell weapons to the other races, whose incessant warfare sends a steady stream of profits and essential resources skyward. Now, generations of dissent and race hatred will not heal -- not even under threat of annihilation at the hands of the legendary tytans. Armed with little more than their wits and a prophecy, elves, humans, and a dwarf must unite to try to save the world from destruction.

Paithan, Caliandra and Aleatha are the three children of one of the richest elves. 

Paithan goes to the nearest human town to conclude an arms deal with two humans, Roland and Rega. They persuade Paithan to travel with them to deliver the arms to the dwarf who ordered them. They plan for Rega to seduce Paithan so that Roland can then accuse and attack him. Instead, Rega actually falls in love with Paithan, and he with her, though a series of misunderstandings delays them in acknowledging their love to each other.

In the meantime, they have finally got close to dwarf lands. They are captured by a dwarf, Drugar and he plans to escort them back to their home and watch as they and all their loved ones die, as his did. Whenever the tytans approach people, they keep asking telepathically "Where is the citadel?" and then kill people when they cannot answer them. 

In the meantime, Haplo has arrived on Pryan, and realising that he passed through to Death's Gate the centre of a massive shell world. He finds his way to the elf city not long after a "human wizard" arrives, who was invited by Caliandra's father, who wanted to know more about the stars in the sky and how to get up there in a rocket.

The wizard is called Zifnab and talks very strangely, making references to other fictional texts including Star Wars. He is accompanied by  a huge wingless dragon who serves him but also mothers him.

The tytans pursue Paithan, Roland, Rega and Drugar through the forests, though they finally get back to the elf city. Haplo tries to fight the tytans, who nearly kill him. Caliandra sacrifices herself to save her siblings, and Haplo, Paithan, Aleatha, Roland, Rega and Drugar, Zifnab and the dragon flee in Haplo's ship. 

They fly upwards towards the stars, and keep flying towards one star until they get close enough to see that it is a citadel, in a forest. Haplo has realised that all the "stars" are citadels scattered around the inner surface of Pryan. The city is surrounded by Sartan warding runes, but they are able to camp nearby.

Haplo leaves the mensch and flies away, back to Death's Gate. Zifnab's dragon pretends to kill Zifnab and attack the mensch, to drive them towards the citadel, and the dwarf Drugar finally realises that the amulet he wears, which is a single Sartan rune, can be used to open the doors and let them into the citadel, where they can live, safe from the tytans.

Criticism and praise

Elven Star was reviewed by Booklist, Library Journal, Publishers Weekly, and Voice of Youth Advocates.

The book hit the bestseller lists for Locus, Waldenbooks, and B. Dalton.

1990 American novels
Novels by Margaret Weis
Novels by Tracy Hickman
The Death Gate Cycle novels
Dwarves in popular culture
Elves in popular culture